Escola Maria Imaculada, founded in 1947, also known as Chapel School, is an accredited American private day school located in  a residential suburb of São Paulo, Brazil, the largest city in South America, with a metropolitan population of approximately 19 million. It possesses the IB Diploma Programme. Chapel's pre-school, elementary and high school are housed on a single campus with an enrollment of 650 students.

Escola Maria Imaculada is a Catholic American elementary and secondary school administered by layman under the mandate issued by the Missionary Oblates of Mary Immaculate. 
It is a Catholic international school with an American emphasis. It is "value-centered" in its commitment to the ideal of Christian education as envisioned by the Catholic Church.
The school is "international" in the make-up of its student body and in its curriculum, which is geared to prepare students for universities in many countries.

Student body
The majority of students are from international business and high socio-economic professional families.

Faculty
Chapel High School faculty consists of a superintendent, principal, Brazilian program director, guidance director, curriculum coordinator, I.B.
coordinator, librarian, athletic director, school chaplain, discipliner, 33 teachers, and 3 assistants. The teacher/student ratio is 1:8. Of the high school teachers, 43% have advanced degrees.
Teachers are recruited from Brazil, Canada, and the United States.

Athletics

Chapel School students have the opportunity to participate in several interscholastic competitions.
Currently a member of the São Paulo High School League, which involves other English-speaking schools in the State of São Paulo, Chapel participates in Big 8, Big 4, and Little 8 tournaments. A variety of competitive sports are available to students: basketball (boys and girls), cheerleading (girls), indoor soccer / futsal (boys and girls), soccer (boys and girls) softball (boys and girls) and volleyball (boys and girls). All sports are offered on both Junior Varsity and Varsity levels.

Curricula

There are five periods per day on a two-day schedule. Each day consists of two blocks of 100 minutes and three classes of 50 minutes.
The academic year consists of two semesters and four grading quarters. Chapel follows the northern hemisphere school calendar.

Chapel School has three comprehensive programs that lead to American, Brazilian and International Baccalaureate diplomas. International Baccalaureate
(I.B.) courses are offered in English, mathematics, science, social studies, religion, modern languages and art. Academic courses in grades 9-10 are college
preparatory. Juniors and seniors follow the I.B. curriculum.
 Language arts - An English course must be taken each semester. English follows a required freshman through senior sequence. Juniors and seniors follow the I.B. curriculum. Electives such as Writing Publication, Pre-IB Writing and others are offered through the Language Arts department.
 Modern languages - A Portuguese language course must be taken each semester. Additional offerings include French, Spanish, and German. I.B. courses are offered in Portuguese and Spanish.
 Mathematics - Core courses consist of Integrated Math I and II (Geometry/Algebra II). Additional course offerings consist of I.B. Mathematical Studies and I.B. Mathematics.
 Physical Education - P.E. is required. An additional course offering is Independent P.E. for 11th graders.
 Science - Core courses include Integrated Science, Biology, Chemistry and Physics. Additional course offerings consist of I.B. Biology, I.B. Chemistry and I.B. Physics.
 Social Studies - The core course is World History. Additional course offerings consist of I.B. History of the Americas, I.B. Economics, I.B. Historical and Contemporary Brazilian Social Studies, I.B. 20th Century History, Comparative Governments, U.S. History, Brazilian History and Brazilian Geography.
 Fine Arts - Elective courses are offered in visual arts and I.B. Art.
 Computer Science and Technology - All 8th graders take Computer Literacy and 9th and 10th graders are offered Computer Science as an elective. 
 Religion - Core courses consist of Old Testament Studies, New Testament Studies, Church History, Morality, Philosophy of Religion and I.B. World Religions. All students are required to take this course.

References 

International schools in Brazil
Private schools in Brazil
Schools in São Paulo
1947 establishments in Brazil
Educational institutions established in 1947